is a railway station in the city of Tochigi, Tochigi, Japan, operated by the private railway operator Tobu Railway. The station is numbered "TN-15".

Lines

Station layout
This station consists of a single island platform serving two tracks, connected to the station building by a footbridge.

Platforms

Adjacent stations

History
Tōbu-kanasaki Station opened on 1 April 1929. It became unstaffed from 8 March 1972. The platform was lengthened in 2006.

From 17 March 2012, station numbering was introduced on all Tobu lines, with Tōbu-kanasaki Station becoming "TN-15".

Passenger statistics
In fiscal 2019, the station was used by an average of 545 passengers daily (boarding passengers only).

Surrounding area
 
 Kanasaki Post Office

See also
 List of railway stations in Japan

References

External links

 Tōbu-kanasaki Station information 

Railway stations in Tochigi Prefecture
Stations of Tobu Railway
Railway stations in Japan opened in 1929
Tobu Nikko Line
Tochigi, Tochigi